Christopher Joseph Weldon (September 6, 1905 – March 19, 1982) was an American prelate of the Roman Catholic Church. He served as bishop of the Diocese of Springfield in Massachusetts from 1950 to 1977.

In 2020, an investigation by the diocese determined that an accusation of sexual abuse of a minor against Weldon was highly credible.

Biography

Early years 
Christopher Weldon was born on September 6, 1905, in the Bronx section of New York City to Patrick and Mary (née Dwyer) Weldon. After graduating from Public School 9 in Manhattan in 1918, he entered the Grand Seminary of Montreal in Montreal, Quebec.  In 1924, Weldon returned to New York to study at St. Joseph's Seminary in Yonkers.

Priesthood 
Weldon was ordained to the priesthood on September 21, 1929, at St. Patrick's Cathedral in Manhattan. Weldon then completed his graduate studies at the Catholic University of America in Washington, D.C. His first pastoral assignment was as assistant pastor at St. John the Evangelist Parish in White Plains, New York, followed by a term at St. Francis of Assisi Parish in Mount Kisco, New York. 

From 1931 to 1935, Weldon served as spiritual director at the Newman School in Lakewood, New Jersey. He left New Jersey in 1935 to become pastor at St. John Chrysostom Church in Bronx, New York.  After one year, he was moved to Blessed Sacrament Church in Manhattan.  In 1942, after the outbreak of World War II, Weldon left New York to serve in the United States Navy Chaplain Corps. Discharged from the Navy in 1946, he returned to New York, where he became master of ceremonies to Cardinal Francis Spellman. Serving as executive director of Catholic Charities from 1947 to 1950, he was raised to the rank of a papal chamberlain in 1947 and a domestic prelate in 1948.

Bishop of Springfield 
On January 28, 1950, Weldon was appointed the fourth bishop of the Diocese of Springfield by Pope Pius XII. He received his episcopal consecration on March 24, 1950, from Cardinal Spellman, with Archbishop Richard Cushing and Bishop Stephen Joseph Donahue serving as co-consecrators. 

During his tenure, Weldon oversaw the construction of Cathedral High School and Our Lady of Lourdes School in Springfield, added a wing to Farren Memorial Hospital in Montague, Massachusetts, and built Mont Marie, the motherhouse of the Sisters of St. Joseph of Springfield. He erected 10 new parishes, and constructed 11 new churches and several parish centers. Weldon established a center for the Hispanic apostolate in Springfield, and a diocesan newspaper in 1954. He attended the Second Vatican Council from 1962 to 1965, and served as president of Elms College from 1958 to 1977.

Retirement and legacy 
After 27 years as bishop, Weldon resigned on October 15, 1977. Christopher Weldon died on March 19, 1982, at Mercy Hospital in Springfield at age 76.

In September 2018, a diocesan Review Board notified Bishop Mitchell T. Rozanski that it had found an allegation of sexual abuse by Weldon credible.  The board cited a Chicopee, Massachusetts, resident who said that Weldon had abused him a child. The board later split on the case, with several members saying that the victim did not name Weldon directly, while three others present maintained they had witnessed otherwise. In June 2019, Rozanski met with the victim, saying he found the allegations "deeply troubling". In June 2020, an investigation by retired Superior Court Judge Peter A. Velis found the victim's claim "to be unequivocally credible."

After Velis' findings were released, Rozanski asked Trinity Health of New England to remove Weldon's name from its rehabilitation center, the former Farren Memorial Hospital in Montague.  Weldon's remains were disinterred and moved to more secluded spot in the cemetery.  He ordered the removal of all photographs, memorials and other mentions of Weldon from all diocesan facilities, schools and churches.

References

1905 births
1982 deaths
People from the Bronx
Catholic University of America alumni
Participants in the Second Vatican Council
United States Navy chaplains
World War II chaplains
20th-century Roman Catholic bishops in the United States
Roman Catholic bishops of Springfield in Massachusetts
Elms College faculty
Catholics from New York (state)
Catholic Church sexual abuse scandals in the United States
Military personnel from Massachusetts